The Canada–France–Hawaii Telescope (CFHT) is located near the summit of Mauna Kea mountain on Hawaii's Big Island at an altitude of 4,204 meters (13,793 feet), part of the Mauna Kea Observatory.

CFHT currently planning a refurbishment to the facility in the 2020s. The facility will be reconstructed with a new 11-m telescope to produce the Maunakea Spectroscopic Explorer, retaining the same base building and infrastructure. First light is expected in 2029.

Funding
The corporation is bound by a tripartite agreement between the University of Hawaii at Manoa, in the United States, the National Research Council (NRC) in Canada and the Centre National de la Recherche Scientifique (CNRS) in France. CFHT also has partnerships with the National Astronomical Observatory of China (NAOC), the Academia Sinica Institute of Astronomy and Astrophysics (ASIAA) in Taiwan, the National Laboratory of Astrophysics (LNA) in Brazil and the Korea Astronomy and Space Science Institute (KASI) in Korea. The contributions from these associate partners help fund CFHT's future instrumentation. Currently, CFHT observing time is offered to scientists from all the seven countries in the partnership. Astronomers from the European Union can also submit proposals through the Optical Infrared Coordination Network for Astronomy (OPTICON) access program.

Instruments
CFHT currently operates four instruments:

 MegaPrime/MegaCam, a one square degree field high-resolution CCD mosaic of 40 CCDs totalling 378 megapixels
 WIRCam (Wide-Field Infrared Camera), an infrared mosaic of 4 detectors totalling 16 megapixels, optimized for the J, H, and K spectral bands
 ESPaDOnS (Echelle SpectroPolarimetric Device for the Observation of Stars at CFHT), an echelle spectrograph/spectropolarimeter
 SITELLE (Spectromètre Imageur à Transformée de Fourier pour l'Etude en Long et en Large de raies d'Emission), a wide-field Fourier transform spectrograph
 SPIRou (Spectropolarimètre Infrarouge), a near-infrared spectropolarimeter

Outreach
CFHT, in collaboration with Coelum Astronomia, maintains a public-outreach website called "Hawaiian Starlight" which offers extremely high-quality versions of CFHT images in various formats including a yearly calendar.

Gallery

See also
List of largest optical reflecting telescopes

References

External links

 The Canada–France–Hawaii Telescope Corporation (official site)
 Hawaiian Starlight
 National Research Council (Canada)
 Centre National de la Recherche Scientifique (France)
 National Astronomical Observatories of China (China)
 ACADEMIA SINICA Institute of Astronomy and Astrophysics (Taiwan) 
 Laboratório Nacional de Astrofisica (Brazil)
 Korean Space Science Institute (Korea)
 Coelum Astronomia
 WIRCAM optical configuration
 Optical Infrared Coordination Network for Astronomy (OPTICON)

Optical telescopes
Astronomical observatories in Hawaii
Buildings and structures in Hawaii County, Hawaii
1979 establishments in Hawaii